Elektafilm a.s., formerly Elektafilm s.r.o. was a Czechoslovak film production and film distribution company that existed from 1923 to 1951. It produced and distributed silent and since 1930 sound films in Czech, German and French languages.

In the 1930s, Elektafilm was the biggest film production company in Czechoslovakia. The most successful Elektafilm-produced film was Gustav Machatý's Ecstasy.
Most of its films were shot at rented A-B Ateliers in Vinohrady, Prague in 1920s, and Barrandov Studios since 1930. Another Czechoslovak production company, Elekta-Journal (1929-1937), had no connection to Elektafilm despite the similar name. Elektafilm frequently worked with directors Martin Frič, Svatopluk Innemann, Karel Lamač and Miroslav J. Krňanský.

History
Elektafilm was founded by Josef Auerbach, Julius Schmitt and Jan Reiter as a limited liability company in 1923. In 1926, Elektafilm acquired a production company Vircofilm. In 1928, the company transformed to joint-stock company. In 1930, Elektafilm bought two other Czechoslovak film production companies Slaviafilm (then owned by Sascha-Film) and Moldaviafilm. In 1932, Auerbach acquired 100% of shares of Elektafilm. He sold Moldaviafilm in 1934. In 1939, Auerbach moved to New York through Brazil because of the worsening political situation for the Jews in Europe. During the war years, the company was taken over by the Germans and produced films for UFA GmbH. In 1945, the company was nationalized and finally dissolved in 1951. Josef Auerbach's effort to get the company back were not successful. In USA, he went into real estate and popcorn business, then he worked with The Mirisch Company. In 1964 he accepted the Academy Award for Lauro Venturi's short documentary film Chagall.

International operations
In the 1930s Elektafilm was co-producing their multi-language movies with French Gaumont Film Company, German Sonorfilm and Ondra-Lamač-Film or Austrian DonauFilm.

Film produced

Elektafilm

Slaviafilm

References

Bibliography
 Auerbach, Norbert: Z Barrandova do Hollywoodu, 2006, Prague: Mladá fronta 
 Jiras, Pavel: Barrandov I: Vzestup k výšinám, 2011, Ottovo nakladatelství 
 Jiras, Pavel: Barrandov II: Zlatý věk (1933-1939), 2012, Ottovo nakladatelství 
 Bednařík, Petr: Arizace české kinematografie, 2003, Karolinum 

Film studios
Film production companies of the Czech Republic
Entertainment companies established in 1923
Film distributors